The Pennsylvania Academy of the Fine Arts (PAFA) is a museum and private art school in Philadelphia, Pennsylvania. It was founded in 1805 and is the first and oldest art museum and art school in the United States. 

The academy's museum is internationally known for its collections of 19th- and 20th-century American paintings, sculptures, and works on paper. Its archives house important materials for the study of American art history, museums, and art training.  It offers a Bachelor of Fine Arts, Master of Fine Arts, certificate programs, and continuing education.

History 

The Pennsylvania Academy of the Fine Arts was founded in 1805 by painter and scientist Charles Willson Peale, sculptor William Rush, and other artists and business leaders. The growth of the Academy of Fine Arts was slow. 

For many years it held its exhibitions in an 1806 building, designed by John Dorsey with pillars of the Ionic order. It stood on the site of the later American Theater at Chestnut and 10th streets. The academy opened as a museum in 1807 and held its first exhibition in 1811, where more than 500 paintings and statues were displayed. The first school classes held in the building were with the Society of Artists in 1810.

The academy had to be reconstructed after the fire of 1845. Some twenty-three years later, leaders of the academy raised funds to construct a building more worthy of its treasures. They commissioned the current Furness-Hewitt building, which was constructed from 1871. It opened as part of the 1876 Philadelphia Exposition.

In 1876, former academy student and artist Thomas Eakins returned to teach as a volunteer. Fairman Rogers, chairman of the Committee on Instruction from 1878 to 1883, made him a faculty member in 1878, and promoted him to director in 1882. Eakins revamped the certificate curriculum to what it used to be today. Students in the certificate program learned fundamentals of drawing, painting, sculpture, and printmaking (relief, intaglio, and lithography) for two years. For the next two years, they had conducted independent study, guided by frequent critiques from faculty, students, and visiting artists.

From 1811 to 1969, the academy organized important annual art exhibitions, from which the museum made significant acquisitions. Harrison S. Morris, managing director from 1892 to 1905, collected contemporary American art for the institution. Among the many masterpieces acquired during his tenure were works by Cecilia Beaux, William Merritt Chase, Frank Duveneck, Thomas Eakins, Winslow Homer, Childe Hassam, and Edmund Tarbell. Work by The Eight, which included former Academy students Robert Henri and John Sloan, is well represented in the collection. It provides a transition between 19th- and 20th- century art movements.

From 1890 to 1906, Edward Hornor Coates served as the tenth president of the academy. In 1915, Coates was awarded the academy's gold medal. Painter John McLure Hamilton, who began his art education at the academy under Thomas Eakins, in 1921 described the contributions Coates made during his tenure:

The reign of Mr. Coates at the Academy marked the period of its greatest prosperity. Rich endowments were made to the schools, a gallery of national portraiture was formed, and some of the best examples of Gilbert Stuart's work acquired. The annual exhibitions attained a brilliancy and éclat hitherto unknown ... Mr. Coates wisely established the schools upon a conservative basis, building almost unconsciously the dykes high against the oncoming flow of insane novelties in art patterns ... In this last struggle against modernism the President was ably supported by Eakins, Anschutz, Grafly, [Henry Joseph] Thouron, Vonnoh, and Chase ... His unfailing courtesy, his disinterested thoughtfulness, his tactfulness, and his modesty endeared him to scholars and masters alike. No sacrifice of time or of means was too great, if he thought he could accomplish the end he always had in view—the honour and the glory of the Academy. It was under Mr. Coates' enlightened direction that was fulfilled the expressed wish of Benjamin West, the first honorary Academician, that "Philadelphia may be as much celebrated for her galleries of paintings by the native genius of the country, as she is distinguished by the virtues of her people; and that she may be looked up to as the Athens of the Western World in all that can give polish to the human mind."

During World War I, academy students were actively involved in war work. "About sixty percent of the young men enlisted or entered Government service, and probably all of the young women and all the rest of the young men were directly or indirectly engaged in war work." A war service club was formed by students and a monthly publication, The Academy Fling, was sent to service members. George Harding, a former PAFA student, was commissioned captain during the war and created official combat sketches for the American Expeditionary Forces.

Women at the Academy 
The 1844 board of directors' declaration that women artists "would have exclusive use of the statue gallery for professional purposes" and study time in the museum on Monday, Wednesday, and Friday mornings signified a significant advance towards formal training in art for women. Prior to the founding of the academy, there were limited opportunities for women to receive professional art training in the United States. This period between the mid-19th and early 20th centuries shows a remarkable growth of formally trained women artists.

By 1860, female students were allowed to take anatomy and antique courses, drawing from antique casts. In addition, women enjoyed their newly acquired library and gallery access. Life classes, the study of the nude body, were available to women in the spring of 1868 with female models; male models were added for study six years later. This came after much debate on whether it was appropriate for women to view the nude male form.

It took twenty-four years before women could take full advantage of all aspects of training at the prestigious institution. After 1868, women took more active leadership roles and achieved influential positions. For example, in 1878 Catherine Drinker, at the age of 27, became the first woman to teach at the academy. One of her pupils, her younger cousin Cecilia Beaux, would leave a lasting legacy at the academy as the first female faculty member to instruct painting and drawing, beginning in 1895. 

By the 1880s, women artists competed with men for top accolades and recognition. Not until much later, however, did the academy gain its first woman on the board of directors in 1950. Among its African American female graduates were Laura Wheeler Waring and Ellen Powell Tiberino. 

Even as women artists were making progress in the United States, they had difficulty studying in Europe. Many of the famous and state-run academies, such as the École des Beaux-Arts in Paris, actively excluded women until the late 19th century, and many of the only opportunities available were through privately run, less prestigious art schools or ateliers of artists. Women who chose to travel overseas typically studied the works of master artists in the galleries, not in classes. 

In 2010, the academy acquired the Linda Lee Alter Collection of Art by Women, nearly 500 works by female artists, from collector Linda Lee Alter. Artists in the collection include those of international renown, such as Louise Bourgeois, Judy Chicago, Louise Nevelson, Kiki Smith and Kara Walker, as well renowned Philadelphia artists including Barbara Bullock and Elizabeth Osborne. In 2012, the academy featured the collection in the exhibition The Female Gaze: Women Artists Making Their World.

Today

The Museum
Since its founding, the academy has collected works by leading American artists, as well as works by distinguished alumni and faculty of its school. Today, the academy maintains its collecting tradition with the inclusion of works by modern and contemporary American artists. Acquisitions and exhibition programs are balanced between historical and contemporary art, and the museum continues to show works by contemporary regional artists and features annual displays of work by academy students. The collection is installed in a chronological and thematic format, exploring the history of American art from the 1760s to the present.

The School
The academy was well known for its longstanding 4-year certificate program. Since 1929, qualified students have been able to apply for and receive a coordinated Bachelor of Fine Arts program at the University of Pennsylvania. Another BFA degree program is offered exclusively in-house (a recent addition) its Master of Fine Arts program, a Post Baccalaureate Certificate in Graduate Studies, and extensive continuing education offerings, as well as programs for children and families.

In 2005, the academy received the National Medal of Arts recognizing it as a leader in fine arts education.

In January 2007, the academy, in association with the Philadelphia Museum of Art, purchased Thomas Eakins's work The Gross Clinic from the Jefferson Medical School. This seminal American work will be displayed at both institutions on a rotating basis.

In January 2009, PAFA signed a historic transfer agreement with Camden County College, New Jersey. The "Camden Connection" allows for the transfer of liberal arts and studio classes as well as providing, on a competitive basis, for partial merit scholarships specifically for Camden County College students. Other transfer agreements are now in place with the following community college art departments: Community College of Philadelphia, Montgomery County Community College, Atlantic Cape Community College, and Northampton Community College.

In 2013, PAFA received Middle States Commission on Higher Education accreditation. PAFA had offered a major in the Certificate and the Bachelor of Fine Arts Program. Starting in Summer 2015, PAFA began offering a low-residency Master of Fine Arts program. Since Fall 2015, PAFA has offered courses in fine arts illustration, which complements painting, drawing, printmaking, and sculpture courses.

Buildings

The Furness-Hewitt building
The current museum building began construction in 1871 and opened in 1876 in connection with the Philadelphia Centennial. Designed by the American architects Frank Furness and George Hewitt, it has been called "One of the most magnificent Victorian buildings in the country." The building's façade draws from a number of different historical styles, including Second Empire, Renaissance Revival and Gothic Revival, amalgamated in an "aggressively personal manner". The building's exterior coloration combines "rusticated brownstone, dressed sandstone, polished pink granite, red pressed brick, and purplish terra-cotta." It was the first structure in the U.S. specifically designed for fine arts instruction and exhibition in a consolidated facility.

The inside of the building is equally varied, combining "gilt floral patterns incised on a field of Venetian red; ... [a] cerulean blue ceiling sprinkled with silver stars", and plum, ochre, sand and olive green gallery walls. The building's structure combines brick, stone and iron; because of fire-proofing concerns, some of the iron i-beams were left uncovered.

1876 opening notes:
The newly Academy of Fine Arts will bear comparison with any institution of its kind in America. It has a front of one hundred feet on Broad Street and a depth of two hundred and fifty-eight feet on Cherry Street. Its situation, with a street on each of its three sides, and an open space along a considerable portion of the fourth, is very advantageous as regards lighting, and freedom from risk by fire.

It is built of brick, the principal entrance, which is two stories high, being augmented with encaustic tiles, terra-cotta statuary, and light stone dressings. The walls are laid in patterns of red and white brick. Over the main entrance on Broad Street there is a large Gothic window with stone tracery. The Cherry Street front is relieved by a colonnade supporting arched windows, back of which is the transept and pointed gable.

Beyond the entrance vestibule is the main staircase, which starts from a wide hall and leads to the galleries on the second floor. Along the Cherry Street side of the Academy are five galleries arranged for casts from the antique; and, further on, are rooms for drapery painting, and the life class. These have a clear north light which can never be obstructed.

On the south side, there is a large lecture room, with retiring rooms, and back of these are the modeling rooms and rooms devoted to the use of students and professors.

On the second floor is the main hall, which extends across the building, and is intended for the exhibition of large works of art. This story is divided into galleries, which are lighted from the top. Through the center runs a hall which is set apart for the exhibition of statuary, busts, small statues, bas-reliefs, etc. On each side of this hall are picture galleries, which are so arranged in size and form as to admit of classification of pictures, and which can be divided into suits where separate exhibitions may be held at the same time.

The art collections of the gallery are considered the most valuable in America. They comprise the masterpieces of Stuart, Sully, Allston, West, and others of our early artists, the Gilpin gallery, fine marbles, and facsimiles of famous statues, as well as a magnificent gallery from the antique.

The academy building is Furness's best known work, and served to establish him as one of the country's top architects. Despite being initially praised by critics, by the turn of the century, tastes had changed and the building was not considered appealing. Eventually, steps were taken to obscure its ornamentation to "modernize" it.

In the post-World War II era, the building was newly appreciated again, with the growth in the historic preservation movement making people more aware of treasures from the past. The building is now considered a masterpiece, one of the greatest buildings in Philadelphia and arguably Furness's greatest work. The building was listed on the National Register of Historic Places in 1971 and designated a National Historic Landmark in 1975. In 1976 the building was fully restored, both its interiors and exteriors, to coincide with its centennial and with the United States bicentennial. The restoration work was conducted through Day and Zimmerman Associates, and headed by Human Myers. In 2019, architectural firm DLR Group completed another renovation on both the Furness-Hewitt and Hamilton buildings to accommodate growth within the institution's fixed site while maintaining the buildings' historic details.

Samuel M.V. Hamilton Building
In 2002, Dorrance H. Hamilton made a large donation to the academy for its expansion. It purchased the former automobile factory at 128 N. Broad Street, next to the original building. Designed by Charles Oelschlager, the building had formerly been used as a federal building.

The structure was renamed in memory of her husband, Samuel M.V. Hamilton. It was renovated and the School of Fine Arts of the academy completed its move there in September 2006. The building also contains a special exhibition space called the Fisher Brooks Gallery, named after James R. Fisher, an artist who attended PAFA in the late 1880s, and Leonie Brooks. They are the grandfather and mother, respectively, of Marguerite Lenfest, a philanthropist and PAFA board member. The Hamilton building also houses Portfolio, the museum's gift shop.

Notable people 

Notable Academy students, faculty and leaders include:

Linda Lee Alter
Charles Andes
Thomas Pollock Anshutz
Thomas N. Armstrong III
Elizabeth Gowdy Baker
Will Barnet
Cornelia Barns
Bo Bartlett
Walter Emerson Baum
Anna Whelan Betts
Ethel Franklin Betts
Cecilia Beaux
Alexander Stirling Calder
Al Capp (attended briefly)
Arthur B. Carles
Mary Cassatt
Jonathan Lyndon Chase
Margaret Covey Chisholm
Edward Hornor Coates
Rachel Constantine
Colin Campbell Cooper
John Rogers Cox
Ralston Crawford
Jack Delano
Vincent Desiderio
Blanche Dillaye
Thomas Eakins
Thomas Harlan Ellett, architect
David Em
Wharton Esherick
Stephen Etnier
Virginia B. Evans
Frances Farrand Dodge
Louise Fishman
A. B. Frost
Frank Furness
Charles Lewis Fussell
Daniel Garber
William Glackens
Charles Grafly
Marie Bruner Haines
William Weeks Hall
Walker Hancock
James Havard
A. G. Heaton
Barkley Hendricks
Robert Henri
Edward Lamson Henry
George Hewitt
Thomas Hovenden
Frances Tipton Hunter
Elsa Jemne
 Maria Louise Kirk 
Christine Lafuente
Sara Larkin
Dorothy P. Lathrop
Frank B. A. Linton
Adelia Armstrong Lutz
David Lynch
Paul Manship
John Marin
Don Martin
Donald Martiny
Elise Mercur, architect
James Metcalf
Alme Meyvis
Katherine Milhous
Abram Molarsky
Edward Percy Moran
Alphonse Mucha
Taras Mychalewych
John Neagle
Alice Neel
Brad Neely
Roy Cleveland Nuse
Violet Oakley
Elizabeth Osborne
Francis Petrus Paulus
Maxfield Parrish
Charles Willson Peale
Rembrandt Peale
Clara Elsene Peck
Louise Pershing 
Jane Piper
Albin Polasek
Howard Pyle
Jacques Reich
Seymour Remenick
Edgar Preston Richardson
Fairman Rogers
Peter F. Rothermel
William Rush
Lawrence Saint
William Sartain
Mary B. Schuenemann
Leopold Seyffert
Michael H. Shamberg
David Sherman
Everett Shinn
John French Sloan
Owen Staples
LeConte Stewart
Frank Wilbert Stokes
Henry O. Tanner
Ellen Powell Tiberino
William B. T. Trego
Orlando Gray Wales
Philip Fishbourne Wharton
Benjamin West
Anita Willets-Burnham

Awards presented to individuals by the academy  

 Widener Gold Medal: The academy established the George D. Widener Gold Medal for sculpture in 1912. Widener was a businessman and director of the academy who died on the RMS Titanic. The award recognizes the "most meritorious work of Sculpture modeled by an American citizen and shown in the Annual Exhibition".

Defunct awards 
 Beck Gold Medal: The Carol H. Beck Gold Medal was awarded to the best portrait by an American artist exhibited at PAFA's annual exhibition. It was awarded from 1909 to 1968.
 Mary Smith Prize: The Mary Smith Prize was awarded to "the Painter of the best painting (not excluding portraits) exhibiting at the Academy, painted by a resident woman Artist." It was awarded from 1879 to 1968.
 Temple Gold Medal: The Joseph Temple Fund Gold Medal was awarded to the best oil painting by an American artist exhibited at PAFA's annual exhibition. It was awarded from 1883 to 1968.

Deaccessioning 
In 2013, the academy sold East Wind Over Weehawken (1934), one of two Edward Hopper paintings in its collection, to start an endowment fund. About 25 percent of the fund will be used to fill gaps in the collection of historic art, with much of the rest to buy contemporary art of undetermined value with hopes for dramatic increases in the future. The painting was sold at auction for $40,485,000, allowing a substantial boost to the museum's then-current endowment of about $23.5 million, but raised new questions about the museum's mission and whether such deaccessionings are in the public interest.

See also 

List of National Historic Landmarks in Philadelphia
National Register of Historic Places listings in Center City, Philadelphia

References
Notes

Bibliography
 The Pennsylvania Academy and its women, 1850–1920: May 3 – June 16, 1974 Pennsylvania Academy of the Fine Arts, Philadelphia, Pennsylvania (exhibition catalogue). Philadelphia, PA: Pennsylvania Academy of the Fine Arts, 1974.
 Pennsylvania Academy of Fine Arts. In This Academy: The Pennsylvania Academy of the Fine Arts, 1805–1976. Museum Press, Inc: Washington, D.C., 1976.

External links

 The original Academy of the Fine Arts, 1869 at the Historical Society of Pennsylvania
 The Academy of the Fine Arts and Its Future: address delivered before the Art Club of Philadelphia by Edward H. Coates (24 January 1890)
 National Register Nomination on the National Park Service website
 HABS Documentation on Library of Congress website
 Philadelphia Architects and Buildings listing of the academy building

 
1805 establishments in Pennsylvania
Art museums established in 1805
Art museums and galleries in Philadelphia
Art schools in Pennsylvania
Educational institutions established in 1805
Frank Furness buildings
Museums of American art
National Historic Landmarks in Pennsylvania
National Register of Historic Places in Philadelphia
School buildings completed in 1876
Universities and colleges in Philadelphia
University museums in Pennsylvania
Center City, Philadelphia
Private universities and colleges in Pennsylvania